Middle East North Africa (MENA) is a submarine communications cable system that is planned to connect Italy, Greece, Egypt, Saudi Arabia, Oman, and India.

In 2018, Telecom Egypt announced its acquisition of the cable from Orascom Telecom Media and Technology Holding.

Cable landing stations 
It will have cable landing points at:
 Mazara, Italy
 Crete, Greece
 Alexandria, Egypt

Then overland to
 Za'frana, Egypt

Then onwards as a submarine cable again to
 Jeddah, Saudi Arabia
 Seeb, Oman
 Mumbai, India

References 

Submarine communications cables in the Mediterranean Sea
Submarine communications cables in the Red Sea
Submarine communications cables in the Indian Ocean
2014 establishments in Africa
2014 establishments in Asia
2014 establishments in Europe